The Kenyan Athletics Championships is an annual track and field meeting which serves as Kenya's national championships for the sport. Athletics Kenya, the country's governing body for athletics organises the event.

The championships is usually held over a three-day period and the location varies, though the capital Nairobi is a frequent choice as it has both Nyayo National Stadium and the Moi International Sports Centre. The national championships may also serve as the trials for selection to the national team for competitions such as the IAAF World Championships in Athletics, Olympic Games, African Championships in Athletics and the Africa Games.

On some occasions the trial events are held separately from the main national championships. As a result of this, the national championships can be less of a focus for Kenyan athletes and lesser performances are produced, with slow tactical races common in the long-distance track events. Athletics Kenya mitigates this by offering cash bonuses for national champions.

The championships was well established by the 1980s, hosting a full range of Olympic-level individual track events for men. By 1981, the women's programme featured track races from 100 metres to 3000 metres, two hurdles events, high jump, long jump, three throws (shot put, discus, javelin), heptathlon and a 20,000 metres track walk. A 10,000 metres was introduced in 1987, a triple jump following in 1991, then the steeplechase and hammer throw came in 1998. The addition of the women's pole vault in 1999 marked parity of events between the sexes at the Kenyan Championships.

Editions
 2015 Athletics Kenya World Championship Trials
 2016 Athletics Kenya Olympic Trials

Championships records

Men

Women

References

Athletics competitions in Kenya
National athletics competitions